Carlo Scorza, fascist
Gaetano Scorza, mathematician
Scorza variety
Manuel Scorza, novelist
Sinibaldo Scorza, painter